Hesar-e Dashtak (also Romanized as Ḩeşār-e Dashtak; also known as Ḩeşār) is a village in Dorudzan Rural District, Dorudzan District, Marvdasht County, Fars Province, Iran. At the 2006 census, its population was 1,281, in 303 families.

References 

Populated places in Marvdasht County